North American area code 931 is the telephone area code serving a horseshoe-shaped region of 28 counties in Middle Tennessee. It covers almost all of Middle Tennessee except for the Nashville metropolitan area.

The 931 area code was created in 1997 from area code 615, which had previously covered almost all of Middle Tennessee, but afterwards was restricted to the inner ring of Nashville. Area code 931 began operation on September 15, 1997. Permissive dialing of 615 continued across Middle Tennessee until January 15, 1998.

Cities covered by area code 931

Algood, Tennessee
Altamont, Tennessee
Baxter, Tennessee
Beersheba Springs, Tennessee
Byrdstown, Tennessee
Celina, Tennessee
Clarkrange, Tennessee
Clarksville, Tennessee 
Dover, Tennessee
Columbia, Tennessee
Cookeville, Tennessee
Cowan, Tennessee
Crossville, Tennessee
Estill Springs, Tennessee
Fayetteville, Tennessee
Gainesboro, Tennessee
Huntland, Tennessee
Jamestown, Tennessee
Lawrenceburg, Tennessee
Lewisburg, Tennessee
Linden, Tennessee
Livingston, Tennessee
Lynchburg, Tennessee
Manchester, Tennessee
McEwen, Tennessee
McMinnville, Tennessee
Monteagle, Tennessee
Monterey, Tennessee
New Johnsonville, Tennessee
Pulaski, Tennessee
Sewanee, Tennessee
Shelbyville, Tennessee
Sparta, Tennessee
Spencer, Tennessee
Spring Hill, Tennessee
Tracy City, Tennessee
Tullahoma, Tennessee
Winchester, Tennessee
Waverly, Tennessee

References

External links

931
931